The women's rhythmic individual all-around competition at the 2019 European Games was held at the Minsk-Arena on 22 June 2019.

Results

References 

Women's rhythmic individual all-around